The Taurus T4 is an assault rifle manufactured by Taurus Firearms. It was presented at the 2017 SHOT Show.

Design
The Taurus T4 is basically an M4 clone fully manufactured in the company's facilities now concentrated in the city of São Leopoldo, Brazil. It is available in three versions with two different barrel lengths, all of which come with six-position telescopic stocks and Picatinny accessory rails. The rifle was designed for military and police use.

Users

 : Used by several law enforcement agencies and in limited role by the Army. In 2019 a decree legalises the possession of T4 carbines by law-abiding citizens.
 : Philippine Army
 : Armed Forces of Senegal
 : 37 T4s to City of Bainbridge Public Safety Department and Decatur County Sheriff’s Department.

References

External links
 Official Taurus T4 webpage

Rifles of Brazil
Automatic rifles
5.56×45mm NATO assault rifles
Weapons and ammunition introduced in 2017